Por una mujer 1972 album by Julio Iglesias. one of the most outstanding songs on the album is a Canto a Galicia the song of the same name which is actually sung in the Galician language also known as Galego, and it was one of Iglesias's best known hits which led to him being known all over Europe and one of the top three artists in Latin America by 1975. Billboard cites it as Iglesias's "first big sales success", and that he also recorded it in Japanese and German, with notable success in Europe, Japan and Mexico.
"Rio Rebelde", "No Soy de Aqui" ("I'm Not from Here") and "Sweet Caroline" were also hits.

Track listing

 Cara A - Lado A.

 "Un Canto a Galicia". (J. Iglesias) (4:15)
 "Hombre Solitario". (R. Wittaker, J. Iglesias) (2:29)
 "Veces Llegan Cartas". (M. Alejandro, A. Magdalena) (3:08)
 "Rio Rebelde". (Ch. Aguirre, R. Uballes) (2:54)
 "Si Volvieras Otra Vez". (J. Iglesias) (3:36)

 Cara B - Lado B.

 "Por Una Mujer". (J. Iglesias) (4:53)
 "No Soy de Aqui". (F. Cabral) (3:43)
 "En Un Rincon Del Desvan". (J. Iglesias, R. Farrán) (4:29)
 "Sweet Caroline". (Neil Diamond) (3:34)
 "Como El Alamo Al Camino". (J. Iglesias) (3:45)

References

1972 albums
Julio Iglesias albums
Spanish-language albums